Ramanujan is a 2014 biographical film based on the life of Indian mathematician Srinivasa Ramanujan. The film, written and directed by Gnana Rajasekaran, was shot back to back in the Tamil and English languages. The film was produced by the independent Indian production house Camphor Cinema, ventured by Srivatsan Nadathur, Sushant Desai, Sharanyan Nadathur, Sindhu Rajasekaran. The cast consists of Indian and British film, stage and screen personalities. It marks the Tamil debut of Abhinay Vaddi, the grandson of veteran Tamil film actors Gemini Ganesan and Savitri, as the protagonist.

Featuring an ensemble cast of Suhasini Maniratnam, Bhama, Kevin McGowan, Abbas Mirza, Nizhalgal Ravi, Michael Lieber, amongst others in supporting roles, the film was set in the early 1900s, tracing the life of Ramanujan, and shot across five different locations, across India and England, which includes Kumbakonam, Namakkal, Chennai, London and Cambridge. The film features, music and background score composed by Ramesh Vinayagam, cinematography handled by Sunny Joseph and editing done by B. Lenin.

Ramanujan was received Tamil Nadu State Film Award for Best Film in 2013, although the film had released, a year later. The film was released worldwide on 11 July 2014, across India and United Kingdom. It was released simultaneously in Tamil and English languages.

Plot 
Set in the early 1900s, the film traces the life of the prodigious math genius Srinivasa Ramanujan from the time he was a young Tamil Brahmin to his years in England, where he attended Cambridge University during World War I. The film follows his relationships with his mother Komalatammal, his wife Janaki, and his collaborator Professor G. H. Hardy. The film also showcases how Indian society viewed a mathematician of such great stature.

Cast 

 Abhinay Vaddi as Srinivasa Ramanujan
 Suhasini Maniratnam as Komalatammal (Srinivasa Ramanujan's Mother)
 Bhama as Janaki (Srinivasa Ramanujan's Wife)
 Kevin McGowan as G. H. Hardy
 Abbas as Prasanta Chandra Mahalanobis
 Anmol as Young Srinivasa Ramanujan
 Michael Lieber as John Edensor Littlewood
 Richard Walsh as Francis Spring
 Sharath Babu as Diwan Bahadur R. Ramachandra Rao I. C. S.
 Radha Ravi as Prof. Singaravelu Mudaliar
 Madhan Bob as Prof. Krishna Shastri
 Y. G. Mahendran as S. Narayana Iyer
 Manobala as Krishna Rao
 Nizhalgal Ravi as Srinivasa Raghavan
 Satish Kumar as Anandhu
 Thalaivasal Vijay as Sathiyapriya Rayar
 Manibharathi as Krishnan
 Delhi Ganesh
 Raja Krishnamoorthy as Seshu Iyer
 T. P. Gajendran as T. Namberumal Chetty
 Mohan V. Ram
 Cloudia Swann as Ms. Bourne
 Mike Parish as Doctor Charles
 Harsh Naik as Chatterjee
 Lizzie Bourne as Ms. Gertrude Hardy

Production

Casting 

Gnana Rajasekaran looked for an actor who would physically resemble Ramanujan and signed Abhinay Vaddi, who is the grandson of veteran Tamil actor Gemini Ganesan, for the main role. Michael Lieber was signed to play Edensor Littlewood. Lieber confessed he had no knowledge of Ramanujan, when he signed the film, and went as far as to meet Béla Bollobás, who worked with Littlewood personally, for his research work. He found it difficult to speak the Tamil lines, but appreciated it later on, "I would be lying if I said that the task of learning Tamil was not daunting at first, but once I got the hang of it I was able to appreciate what a beautiful language it is. There were many different ways of learning the Tamil lines; some used audio tapes, prompting, flash cards, or word boards. I learnt the meaning of the words and memorised chunks of dialogue." Similarly, Kevin McGowan, who was signed for the role of G. H. Hardy, was unfamiliar with the story of Ramanujan. The film also stars Bhama, Suhasini Maniratnam, Abbas and Richard Walsh amongst others. Sunny Joseph, best known for his high-profile Malayalam works with directors Adoor Gopalakrishnan and Shaji N. Karun, was signed as cinematographer.

Filming 

The film has been shot in the five main locations of Ramanujan's life, Kumbakonam, Namakkal, Chennai, London and Cambridge. The first two schedules were shot in India while the third was done in England, where they took the permission of Cambridge University to shoot. The task to create a script in multiple languages was described by Sindhu Rajasekaran as "quite a chore. Roxane de Rouen and I are working with Gnana Rajasekaran, the director of ‘Ramanujan,’ to make the characters speak words that make them real. No, you wouldn't find roadside urchins who speak in Queen's English here; people would speak what comes to them naturally: Tamil, English, Indian English, even Tamenglish. What a delight it is to live in this world where languages are not borders, but an element to experiment with..."

Music

The film's soundtrack and score were composed by Ramesh Vinayakam. Vinayakam called it an honour to have composed music for the film and "an opportunity for me to travel on a new path" and added that he was given the required creative freedom by the director and producer. He said that he had to go classical for one part of the film and into European sounds for another segment. No modern instruments, but old world instruments were used in order to bring the period alive, while four orchestral pieces were recorded in Germany, where the composer worked with the Stuttgart-based GermanPops Orchestra that has worked on contemporary and classical styles. Being a film about a mathematician, the songs were related to mathematical terms as well. Poet Vaali had written a number, "Narayana Narayana", which was said to "incorporate the idea of infinity and nothingness", while another number, written by Thirumalisai Alvar thousands of years ago, "stresses that numbers are absolute". One of the instrumental tracks, "One to Zero" was described as a "musical metaphor" as it was based on the numbers, with Vinayakam explaining, "One is represented by one note, two by two notes and so on, while zero is represented by a rest. After the initial exposition, at any point of time, three of these layers criss-cross each other from a distance of one beat from each other". "Narayana" was sung by Vani Jayaram, who said that she was initially surprised that she was given a song whose pitch (shruthi) was less than what she usually sings in but learned that, in the days of Ramanujan, people only sang in that pitch.

The soundtrack album of Ramanujan was released at the Suryan FM radio station in Chennai on 13 June 2014. The album, which features eight tracks, including four songs and four instrumentals, was praised by critics. Indiaglitz in its review wrote, "Ramesh Vinayakam was always there and thereabouts with his wonderful albums in the past. With this album he has struck the right chords towards his name once again. This must be the break he's been looking for years". musicaloud.com gave it a score of 9 out of 10 and wrote, "Ramesh Vinayakam expertly draws from Carnatic and Western classical styles to produce one of the finest period film soundtracks ever". Behindwoods.com gave it 3 stars out of 5 and wrote, "Ramanujan enthralls the listener by transporting them to a bygone era of classical music". Noted Malayalam film composer M. Jayachandran, praised Vinayakam for his music in Ramanujan. The album was also named by Deccan Music and Milliblog as the best Tamil music album of the year 2014.

Release 
The official trailer of the film was released on 16 June 2014. On 9 July 2014, the producers of Ramanujan arranged a special screening at the Rashtrapati Bhavan, receiving an invitation from the president Pranab Mukherjee. The film was simultaneously released in India and United Kingdom in Tamil and English languages on 11 July 2014. After the film's theatrical run, the makers released the VCD and DVD formats of the film in late 2014, which featured the making video, behind-the-scenes featurette, and deleted scenes from the film.

Reception
The film received mixed reviews from critics, who generally praised the acting but criticized the writing. The Deccan Chronicle called Ramanujan "a brilliant piece on canvas with edifying moments and relevance to modern age" and went on to add that it was "not to be missed", giving it 3.5/5 stars. S. Saraswathi of Rediff wrote, "Ramanujan is a brilliant film, a must watch" and gave the film 4/5. Gautaman Bhaskaran of The Hindustan Times gave the film 3/5 stars and wrote, "The movie is a poignant look at the way a prodigy struggled and suffered in a penurious family, a mastermind whose mathematical wizardry invited ridicule and revulsion in far lesser mortals. Rajasekaran, who also scripted the film, takes us through a linear narrative to tell us about the intelligence of boy Ramanujan as he completely foxes his school-master with a little insight into the importance of zero, and later about his frustration when he hits a wall in his quest to sink into, and shine, with numbers". Sify wrote, "Making biopics is indeed very challenging and the director has been successful to a very large extent to bring out each and every character. Gnana Rajasekaran has done a well-researched biopic on Ramanujam...it is a film that is definitely worth viewing". IANS gave it 3/5 and wrote, "Gnana Rajasekaran certainly knows the art and succeeds narrating an inspiring tale, but his work doesn’t resonate deep within. This is so because the director merely recreates several important episodes from Ramanujan’s life on the screen while ignoring the need to build a screenplay to keep the viewers hooked". Bharath Vijayakumar of Moviecrow rated 3/5 stars and said, "Ramanujan is a noble effort and a fascinating insight about the life and times of this Maths Wizard who lived all his life in unison with his true love.".

In contrast, The New Indian Express wrote, "The director’s persistent effort to bring on celluloid lives of eminent people is laudable. But a movie is not only about the theme, but also about how it is presented on screen. And the presentation of the life and journey of the mathematical genius is disappointing and uninspiring". Baradwaj Rangan of The Hindu wrote, "The film runs nearly three hours and it’s puzzling why it needed to. There appears to have been no effort to streamline the events of Ramanujan’s life. The writing, too, fails to make Ramanujan interesting", going on to add "The great man certainly deserved a better movie". M. Suganth of the Times Of India gave 2.5/5 and wrote, "For a film that is about a man with astounding talent, the filmmaking is largely unimaginative. The staging is somewhat old-fashioned (read dated), the pacing staid and the film often slips into the kind of melodrama that you nowadays find in TV serials.". Daily India gave 2.5/5 and stated, "In overall, Ramanujan is a cleanly made and it's a very rare kind of movie in biopics genre. Editing and cinematography is worth praising. Abhinay Vaddi, the grandson of veteran Tamil film actor Gemini Ganesan done a good job and made justice to their roles.". Indiaglitz gave 2.25/5 and wrote, "An honest attempt to drive through the life of a genius gets stuck at lot of bumpers.".

Awards 
Ramanujan won the Tamil Nadu State Film Award for Best Film of 2013.

See also 
 The Man Who Knew Infinity (film)
 * Ramanujan - Movie in Tamil- Youtube
 * Ramanujan - Movie in Hindi- Youtube

References

External links
 

2014 films
Biographical films about mathematicians
2010s Tamil-language films
Indian biographical films
Films about mathematics
Indian independent films
Films scored by Ramesh Vinayakam
Indian films based on actual events
Srinivasa Ramanujan
2010s biographical films
2014 independent films
2014 multilingual films
Indian multilingual films
Films directed by Gnana Rajasekaran